Miomyrmex is an extinct genus of ant of the subfamily Dolichoderinae. The fossils were first discovered in the United States in the state of Colorado in 1930.

Species
There are two species in this extinct genus.
 
Miomyrmex impactus Cockerell, 1927
Miomyrmex striatus Carpenter, 1930

References

†
Oligocene insects
Hymenoptera of North America
Fossil taxa described in 1930
Fossil ant genera
Prehistoric insects of North America